The World Today is a monthly global affairs magazine founded by Chatham House in 1945. It was formerly published six times a year and aims to bring the Institute's analysis to a broad audience. It replaced the Bulletin of International News, which was published from 1925 to 1945.

Following its re-design in February 2012, the magazine has moved from a monthly to a bi-monthly format and been extended to 52 pages. Prominent contributors have included Niall Ferguson, Jon Snow, Carl Bildt, and Colombian President Manuel Santos.

As well as covering major issues in international relations, the magazine contains book, film and museum reviews from around the world. The magazine is sent to decision-makers in nine of the 10 largest FTSE 100 companies by market capitalization and major embassies in London, as well as to key individuals in the British Parliament, Whitehall, the media, and the academic world.

Editors
Liliana Brisby was the editor from 1975 until her retirement in 1983.
Graham Walker (1946-2016) was the editor from 1995 to 2010.
Alan Philps was the editor from 2012 to 2021.
Roxanne Escobales has been the editor since May 2021.

References

External links

 
 Digital edition of The World Today - Exact Editions

Book review magazines
Bi-monthly magazines published in the United Kingdom
Monthly magazines published in the United Kingdom
News magazines published in the United Kingdom
Publications of Chatham House
Magazines published in London
Magazines established in 1945
Political magazines published in the United Kingdom